This Little World is a 1934 novel by the British writer Francis Brett Young. It is set in a Worcestershire village in the early 1920s, where the recent First World War presages social change. It has a number of similarities with another of his books of the period Portrait of a Village, published three years later.

References

Bibliography
 Cannadine, David. In Churchill's Shadow: Confronting the Past in Modern Britain. Oxford University Press, 2004.

1934 British novels
Novels by Francis Brett Young
Novels set in Worcestershire
Heinemann (publisher) books
Harper & Brothers books